The 4×100 metres relay at the World Championships in Athletics has been contested by both men and women since the inaugural edition in 1983. It is the second most prestigious title in the discipline after the 4×100 metres relay at the Olympics. The competition format typically has one qualifying round leading to a final between eight teams. As of 2015, nations can qualify for the competition through a top eight finish at the previous IAAF World Relays event, with the remaining teams coming through the more traditional route of ranking highly on time in the seasonal lists.

The championship records for the event are 37.04 seconds for men, set by Jamaica in 2011, and 41.07 seconds for women, set by Jamaica in 2015. The men's world record has been broken or equalled at the competition on four occasions. The women's world record has never been broken or equalled at the competition.

The United States is the most successful nation in the discipline, with eight men's gold medals and eight women's gold medals. The next most successful nation is Jamaica, which has won four gold medals for men's and five for the women's events. Jamaica won in 1991, 2009, 2013, 2015, and 2019. The USA has won the most overall medals at 24 with Jamaica having the second most at 22. Canada, with three golds, and France, with two, are the only other nations to have won multiple titles. Great Britain has the third highest overall medal tally in the event with 14 medals.

Shelly-Ann Fraser-Pryce is the most successful athlete of the event, with four gold medals and three silver medals. Her compatriot Usain Bolt is the next most successful, with four consecutive gold medals from 2009 to 2015 and a silver medal in 2007. Kerron Stewart and Nesta Carter of Jamaica and Carl Lewis of the USA are the only other athletes to have won three gold medals in the relay event.

The United States has twice been stripped of the gold medal due to doping by athletes on the national team, having lost both men's and women's titles in 2001.

Age
All information from IAAF

 Only the birth year is known for Ghana's Elizabeth Wilson, although calculating her age from 1 January that year still makes her the youngest female participant.

Doping
The men's event was affected by doping in its debut tournament in 1983, with Ben Johnson running for Canada, although the team did not progress beyond the first round. Johnson's drug use was only self-admitted during this period and he did not fail a drug test that year. Johnson ran for the fourth-placed Canada team at the 1987 event. His Canadian team mate Angella Issajenko later became the first female relay athlete to be sanctioned – she helped Canada to fifth at the same edition.

The positive drug test for Nigeria's Innocent Asonze in 1999 marked the first instance where a medal-winning team was disqualified at the World Championships in Athletics. Brazil was elevated to the bronze medal as a result. Doping persisted two years later, as France's Christophe Cheval was disqualified after a positive test for nandrolone shortly before the event (the team were semi-finalists only). The greatest disqualifications yet followed after the BALCO scandal in 2005. Tim Montgomery of the 2001-winning men's team was later disqualified following his admission of doping during the period, meaning that the American gold medallists were stricken from the record (South Africa were elevated as champions). Similarly, Marion Jones's and Kelli White's admitted usage led to the disqualification of the winning American women's team (Germany were made champions as a result).

The impact of the BALCO scandal extended to the 2003 edition, as medals were again reassigned as a result of British athlete Dwain Chambers doping. Brazil were elevated to silver and the Netherlands became the bronze medallists. The next doping disqualification to occur in the relay was in 2009, when Nigerian women's runner Toyin Augustus had her team's first round result annulled. A similar fate met Lim Hee-Nam and the South Korean men in 2011. The fourth-placed Trinidad and Tobago team had their result retrospectively disqualified due to Semoy Hackett's failed doping test prior to the competition. A third straight championships was affected as a result of Ukraine's Yelyzaveta Bryzhina failing a doping test for drostanolone (as of 2015 the Ukrainian relay team's first round result still stands, however).

Medalists

Men

Multiple medalists

Medals by country

Women

Multiple medalists

Medals by country

Championship record progression

Men

Women

 Russia and the United States team shared the same championship record time of 41.49, although Russia won the title when measuring the time down to thousandths of a second

Finishing times

Top ten fastest World Championship times

References

Bibliography

External links
Official IAAF website

 
World Championships in Athletics
Events at the World Athletics Championships